The Argentine Cricket Association (Spanish: Asociación de Críquet Argentino; ACA), also branded Cricket Argentina, is the governing body of the sport of cricket in Argentina. The organization was founded in 1913, and has been an associate member of the International Cricket Council (ICC) since 1974. Its headquarters is located in Buenos Aires, where Argentina's oldest cricket club is located.

See also
 Cricket in Argentina
 Argentina national cricket team
 Argentina women's national cricket team

References

External links
 
 Cricinfo-Argentina on ESPN

Cricket administration
Cricket in Argentina
Cricket
Sports organizations established in 1913
1913 establishments in Argentina